Cordulephya is a genus of dragonflies in the family Cordulephyidae, endemic to eastern Australia. 
The species are small to tiny in size, coloured black, or purplish-black, with yellowish markings. Unusually for Anisoptera, these dragonflies rest with their wings folded above their body in a similar manner to many species of damselfly. They are commonly known as shutwings.

Species
The genus Cordulephya includes four species:

References

Cordulephyidae
Anisoptera genera
Odonata of Australia
Endemic fauna of Australia
Taxa named by Edmond de Sélys Longchamps